Sparks is a city in Washoe County, Nevada, United States. It was founded in 1904, incorporated on March 15, 1905, and is located just east of Reno. The 2020 U.S. Census counted 108,445 residents in the city.  It is the fifth most populous city in Nevada. It is named after John Sparks, Nevada Governor (1903–1908), and a member of the Silver Party.

Sparks is located within the Reno–Sparks metropolitan area.

History
Euro-American settlement began in the early 1850s, and the population density remained very low until 1904 when the Southern Pacific Railroad built a switch yard and maintenance sheds there, after moving the division point from Wadsworth. In 1902, The Southern Pacific purchased a large tract of swamp-like land near its newly built railyard, and gave everyone clear deed to a  lot for the sum of $1. They also offered to pick up and move every house in Wadsworth and reassemble it in this new town free of charge.  As the population increased, a city was established, first called Harriman, after E.H. Harriman, president of the Southern Pacific, and then renamed Sparks, after John Sparks, then governor of Nevada.

Sparks remained a small town until the 1950s, when economic growth in Reno triggered a housing boom north of the railroad in the area of Sparks. During the 1970s, the area south of the railroad started to fill up with warehouses and light industry. In 1984, the tower for the Nugget Casino Resort was finished, giving Sparks its first, and currently only, high-rise casino. In 1996, the redevelopment effort of the B Street business district across from the Nugget that started in the early 1980s took a step forward with the opening of a multi-screen movie complex and the construction of a plaza area. This area, now known as Victorian Square, is a pedestrian-friendly district that hosts many open-air events.

Under direction of the U.S. Environmental Protection Agency, a comprehensive dynamic water quality computer model, the DSSAM Model, was developed (Earth Metrics, 1987) to analyze impacts of a variety of land use and stormwater management decisions throughout the  Truckee River basin; this model was used to develop a set of surface runoff stormwater management measures for Sparks in the 1980s.

Panasonic Energy's manufacturing plant in Sparks, Gigafactory 1, produces EV batteries for Tesla. It employed about 7,000 people in 2020.

Geography
Stormwater surface runoff from the city drains into the Truckee River, a sensitive waterway that empties into Pyramid Lake, which has no outlet and is the habitat of two endangered species.

Climate
Sparks has a semi-arid climate. Due to frequent low humidity, especially in the summer, daily temperature ranges are fairly wide.

There are an average of 45 days with measurable precipitation.

Sparks has a cold desert climate (BW) with warm to hot summers and cool to cold winters. There is a great amount of diurnal temperature variation, causing summers to go from very hot during the day to cool at night. Winter temperatures during the day go well above freezing but can go to as low as  during the night.

Demographics

As of the American Community Survey of 2018, there were 104,246 people, 38,056 households residing in the city. The racial makeup of the city was 76.8% White, 2.5% African American, 1.5% Native American, 5.7% Asian, 0.5% Pacific Islander, and 5.0% from two or more races. Hispanic or Latino of any race were 29.3% of the population.

In 2018, the population of the city was spread out, with 23.5% under the age of 18 and 15.3% who were 65 years of age or older. There were 50.3% females.

In 2018 the estimated median income for a household in the city was $60,785 and 9.9% of the population were below the poverty line.

Arts and culture

Cultural events include the Best in the West Nugget Rib Cook-off.

Tourist attractions include the Great Basin Brewing Company, Nugget Casino Resort, and Scheels – The World's Largest All-Sports Store; featuring multiple indoor displays and exhibits, including an indoor ferris wheel, two giant aquariums one can walk through/under.

Libraries
Sparks has two public libraries, one downtown adjacent, and another in Spanish Springs. Both are branches of the Washoe County Library System.

In 2019, the Sparks library started a Drag Queen Story Hour, despite opposition from parents and conservative groups.

Parks and recreation
The Nugget Event Center is an 8,600 seat outdoor concert amphitheater in downtown Sparks.

Sparks Marina Park was established on a naturally occurring aquifer in Sparks. Aquatic activities include windsurfing, sailing, swimming, scuba diving, fishing and boating. The surrounding park includes walking paths, a dog park, volleyball courts, playgrounds, picnic areas, showers, and a concession stand.

The Mustang Ranch, described as "Nevada's most infamous brothel", has operated at various locations east of Sparks since 1967.

Sparks is home to two golf courses, Wildcreek, and Red Hawk.

Education

Public education in Sparks is administered by the Washoe County School District. Schools located within the city district territory include:

High Schools
 Edward C. Reed High School
 Sparks High School
 Spanish Springs High School
Middle Schools
 Sky Ranch Middle School
 Sparks Middle School
 Mendive Middle School
 Dilworth Middle School
 Desert Skies Middle School
 Yvonne Shaw Middle School
Elementary Schools
 Robert Mitchell Elementary School
 Alice Maxwell Elementary School
 Florence Drake Elementary School
 Greenbrae Elementary School
 Lena Juniper Elementary School
 Bud Beasley Elementary School
 Van Gorder Elementary School
 Alyce Taylor Elementary School
 Jesse Hall Elementary School
 Spanish Springs Elementary School
 Excel Christian School – a private institution.
 Katherine Dunn Elementary School
Miguel Sepulveda Elementary School
 Lloyd Diedrichsen Elementary School

Infrastructure

Transportation

The Regional Transportation Commission of Washoe County (RTC) operates a city bus system that services the cities of Reno and Sparks.

Sparks is served by the nearby Reno–Tahoe International Airport.

Rail
The Union Pacific Railroad runs east–west through the center of Sparks. The Union Pacific has a significant rail yard south of I-80, just south and adjacent to the Nugget Hotel/Casino towers in downtown Sparks, and is a central part of the area's industrial park. Passenger rail service to the Sparks Amtrak Station ended in 2009, although service continues in neighboring Reno by the California Zephyr.

Roads
Interstate 80 runs east–west through Sparks. State Route 445 (Pyramid Way), El Rancho Drive, Sullivan Lane, Rock Boulevard, Sparks Boulevard, Vista Boulevard, and State Route 659 (McCarran Blvd) are the city's major north–south thoroughfares. Pyramid Way runs from Nugget Avenue in downtown Sparks to Pyramid Lake, about 35 miles north of the city, and has been designated a Nevada Scenic Byway.

Sparks is connected directly to south Reno by the Southeast Connector. It is a northerly extension of Veterans Parkway to the  Sparks Boulevard at Greg Street. It serves as an expressway, with only 2 signaled intersections along its 5.5 mile stretch (one at Pembroke Drive and one at Mira Loma Drive), and constitutes a major arterial connection between Reno and Sparks. It provides an alternative route to existing, overcrowded routes such as the US-395/I-580 freeway, Rock Boulevard, and McCarran Boulevard. Construction began in late 2013, and was completed in July 2018.

Sparks also is gearing up for the record of decision on a major, $1.1 billion (estimated) arterial road project, one that will turn a large portion of Pyramid Highway through nearby Spanish Springs into a controlled access, high speed arterial road that connects directly with the US 395 freeway via a complex interchange at the current Parr Boulevard connection. This will directly connect Spanish Springs, a major population center (parts of which are annexed with the city of Sparks), located in the valley just north of Sparks, with the existing Reno/Sparks freeway system which consists currently of Interstate 80 and US 395. This project will also offer more direct freeway system and inter-valley connections to and from Sun Valley, another major population center of the Reno/Sparks metropolitan statistical area. Sun Valley is located just north of Reno and just west of Spanish Springs, and is home to just over 20,000 residents as of 2020.

Notable people
 Mädchen Amick (b. 1970), actress on Twin Peaks and Witches of East End, born in Sparks
 T. J. Bell (b. 1980), motorsport driver, grew up in Sparks
 Scott Cousins (b. 1985), professional baseball player
 Brian Crane, syndicated cartoonist of Pickles
 Jacob Dalton (b. 1991), Olympic gymnast
 Jim Gibbons (b. 1944), former governor of Nevada
 David S. Loeb (1924–2003), businessman, co-founder of Countrywide and IndyMac
 Jena Malone (b. 1984), actress, The Hunger Games, Pride & Prejudice
 Jake McGee (b. 1986), professional baseball player
 Brian Retterer (b. 1972), NCAA champion swimmer
 Karl Rove (b. 1950), political activist, lobbyist, pundit, and Deputy White House Chief of Staff
 Dan Serafini (b. 1974), professional baseball player with Naranjeros de Hermosillo
 Josh Weston (1973–2012), adult film star
 Vernon White (b. 1971), mixed martial artist

See also

References

Further reading
 Joyce M. Cox, Sparks (Images of America series, Arcadia Publishing, 2017).
 Earth Metrics Inc., C. M. Hogan, Marc Papineau, et al. Development of a dynamic water quality simulation model for the Truckee River,  Environmental Protection Agency Technology Series, Washington, D.C. (1987).
 Sparks Centennial History Book committee, History of Sparks: Centennial Edition (2004).

External links
 
 Chamber of Commerce

 
Cities in Nevada
Cities in Washoe County, Nevada
Populated places established in 1904
Reno, NV Metropolitan Statistical Area